Tuf Jarred Borland (born March 23, 1998) is a former American football linebacker and coach for the Wisconsin Badgers. He played college football at the Ohio State University. After going undrafted in the 2021 NFL Draft, he signed with the Minnesota Vikings. He appeared in two games with Minnesota during the 2021 season, but was released in 2022.

High school career
Playing at Bolingbrook High School, Borland committed to Ohio State on April 17, 2015. He chose the Buckeyes over Michigan State, Penn State, and Wisconsin among others. He was rated as a four-star recruit by 247Sports and Scout. He was recruited by Luke Fickell.

College career
Borland redshirted as a freshman in the 2016 season. In the 2017 season, he appeared in 11 games and had 58 total tackles and one sack as a redshirt freshman. In the 2018 season, he was named a captain and had 67 total tackles, three sacks, one pass defense, and two forced fumbles in his redshirt sophomore season. In the 2019 season, he remained as a captain and had 55 total tackles, one sack, and one interception in his redshirt junior season. During the 2020 season, Tuf was elected a three-time captain and was the 2nd leading tackler with 55 total tackles, 1.5 sacks and one interception while helping lead the Buckeyes to a CFP National Championship appearance, including a Sugar Bowl victory over the Clemson Tigers where he was named Defensive MVP.

Professional career

Borland signed with the Minnesota Vikings as an undrafted free agent on May 5, 2021. He was waived on August 31, 2021, and re-signed to the practice squad the next day. He signed a reserve/future contract with the Vikings on January 10, 2022. He was released on May 16, 2022.

Coaching career
Borland joined Wisconsin's coaching staff as a graduate assistant in 2023.

Personal life
Tuf is the son of Jeny and Kyle Borland. In addition to football, he played basketball and baseball for two years.

References

External links
Ohio State Buckeyes bio

1998 births
Living people
Players of American football from Illinois
Sportspeople from DuPage County, Illinois
American football linebackers
Ohio State Buckeyes football players
People from Bolingbrook, Illinois
Minnesota Vikings players